Béja is a city in Tunisia. It is the capital of the Béja Governorate.

History

Etymology

Classical era period 
The city endured brutal assaults by the Carthaginians, the Numidians, the Romans, and, later on, by the Vandals.  The Numidian king Jugurtha made the town his governing headquarters.  Originally the town was named Waga, which became Vacca and then Vaga under the Romans and eventually Baja under the Arabs and Béja under the French.

The Romans destroyed the old Carthaginian citadel and replaced it with a new one; they built fortifications that are still standing today.  Under the Roman domination, Béja became prosperous and was the center of a diocese.  According to Sallust, who relates the details of the Jugurthine War between Jugurtha and Quintus Caecilius Metellus Numidicus to possess Béja, Béja was the wealthiest warehouse of the kingdom and the center of intense commerce.

The city was taken and destroyed by the Vandals. The citadel and ramparts were demolished. The abandoned town remained in that state for a century until the arrival of the Byzantines.  They renovated the fortress and took real pleasure in beautifying Béja.

After the Umayyad conquest of North Africa, the city became part of the Umayyad Caliphate.

In 1880 France occupied Tunisia.  On April 24, 1881, Béja in its turn was occupied by the column led by Logerot who had arrived from Algeria through the Kef.

World War II
On November 16, 1942, a German military delegation came to Béja to give Mayor Jean Hugon a 24-hour ultimatum to surrender the city. In response to the ultimatum the Mayor informed civil governor, Clement, who in turn sent the message to Algiers. The next day, November 17, the first British parachute battalion landed on the hills north of the city. On Thursday November 19 German planes bombed the town for the first time, as a warning.  This broke the long period of peace Béja had known for many centuries. The next day, Friday November 20, Béja was heavily bombed by German airplanes for many hours, because of its key position leading to the roads of Tabarka, Mateur, Bizerte and Algeria.  The town became the stage for ferocious battles between the Germans and the Allies who fiercely defended it, at the expense of severe military and civil losses. The final German assault Operation Ochsenkopf – was launched from Mateur and was halted  from Béja, on the night of February 28, 1943, by British troops.

Geographical features 
Located in North West Tunisia on the White Hill and crossed by the Medjerda River, the features made the city famous for its fertile soil, Béja drew all the masters of the Mediterranean.  The Phoenicians set up important trading posts.  Their presence is felt through numerous Punic necropolis which have been unearthed in 1887.  The Carthaginians, recognizing the importance of maintaining their authority in this area, built a garrison and fortified the town.  Béja was extremely desirable, not only because of its fertile soil but because
of its geographic location.  It was at the doorway of the mountains and it was the crossroad for Carthage and Tunis going toward Cirta and Hippone.

Climate 
Béja has a hot-summer Mediterranean climate (Köppen climate classification Csa).

Administration 

The Béja is the chef-lieu of the Béja Governorate. The city is since July 13, 1887, a municipality, from that day to today there were built 3 town halls, the last one was built in 1933, the building is now a classified monument.

Religion 
Like the rest of Tunisians, most of the Béjeans are Muslims with a small minority of irreligious. In the past there was a small community of Jews and a bigger one of Christians (most of them were European colons), but after the independence of Tunisia from France, all of them quit the city to Europe, North America and Israel.
The city shelters many religion buildings like mosques, churches and synagogues. The oldest mosque of the town is Great Mosque of Béja which was built in 944 by the Fatimids on an old Christian basilica. Near it there is another mosque, the Bey's Mosque, which was built in 1675 by Murad II Bey for the Hanafi Muslims of the city. In 1685 Mohamed Bey El Mouradi added a Madrasa to the mosque.

After the settlement of the French protectorate in Tunisia, many Europeans come to the city to exploit the rich agricultural land, so to satisfy their religious demands the colonial authorities decided a church which was completed in 1883. After the increasing in number of colons in Béja, the church become too small for them, so the authorities decided to demolish it and build instead of it a bigger one, The Notre-Dame-du-Rosaire Church. After the independence of Tunisia and the migration of Christians from the country, the church become a cultural centre in Béja.

Education 

There are 15 elementary schools, 7 preparatory schools, 6 secondary schools and 3 educational institutes in Béja.

Elementary schools 
 Victor Hugo Elementary School
 Farhat Hached Elementary School
 Habib Bourguiba Avenue Elementary School
 El-Moustakbel Elementary School
 Sidi Fredj Elementary School
 El-Mahla Elementary School
 Ali El-Kalsadi Elementary School
 Ksar Bardo Elementary School
 Hay Essoker 1 Elementary School
 Hay Essoker 2 Elementary School
 El-Mzara Elementary School

Preparatory schools 

 Al-Iadhi Al-Beji Preparatory School
 Ali Al-Qalsadi Preparatory School
 Ibn Al-Jazar Preparatory School
 Habib Bourguiba Avenue Preparatory School
 Rached Preparatory School
 Béja Al*Moustakbel Preparatory School
 Al-Houria Preparatory School
 Ibn-Arafa Preparatory School

Secondary schools 

 Ibn Al-Haytham Secondary School
 Ibn Al-Jazzar Secondary School
 March 2, 1934, Secondary School
 Al-Biaa Secondary School
 Ali Belhouane Secondary School
 Omar El Kalchani Secondary School

Institutes 
 Higher Institute of Technological Studies of Béja
 Higher Institute of Biotechnology of Béja
 Higher Institute of Applied Languages and Computer of Béja

Historical Places 

Kasbah of Béja : The Kasbah of Béja, is a castle built during the Roman area over the ruins of another Carthaginian castle, the Kasbah was destroyed during the Vandal invasion of Tunisia, it was lately rebuilt by the Byzantine Empire and improved and fortified through the years of the Islamic rule, the Kasbah played a major role in protecting the city from various invasion, it's located on the top of the city.
Béja Bardo Palace : Is an ancient royal residence built by the heir of the Husainid thrown Ali Pecha II in 1734 then it was renovated by Ali Pecha II. The Bardo Palace of Béja is now in ruins. 
The Great Mosque of Béja : The Great Mosque of Béja is one of the oldest mosques of the country, built in 944 by the Fatimide Caliph Al-Mansur Billah in 944 on the ruins of an old Roman basilica.
Mosque Al-Jazzar is a very old mosque built by Ahmed Al-Jazzar, a Muslim ascetic, during the Aghlabib era in the 10th century.
The Hanafi Mosque : The Hanafi Mosque is a mosque built in Béja in 1675 by Murad II Bey, it's called the Hanafit mosque because it was dedicated to the Hanafi minority of the city. 
Sidi Boutefeha Mausoleum : Sidi Boutefeha Mausoleum is a mausoleum built in the 17th century in memory to the young Sufi Wali Sidi Sulaymeb Al-Tamimi who was known as Boutefeha (The Father of The Appel).
Sidi Baba Ali Smadhi Mausoleum : Sidi Baba Ali Smadhi Mausoleum is mausoleum built 1666 by the Sufi Marabout Ali Smadhi. The Mausoleum played a major role during the Husainid-Pechist civil war, it's also an important cultural and political center of Béja.

The Qadiriyya Mausoleum : The Qadiriyya Mausoleum is a mausoleum belonging to the Qadiri Sufi order who was very influential in the city, the mausoleum was built in 1816 by the Sufi poet Miled Jaweni Cherif. The Qadiriyya was also known as the Nakhla Mosque.
The Khadharin Mausoleum : The Khadharin Mausoleum is another Qadiri Sufi order mausoleum built in 1780 by Ahmed Blagui.
Sidi Salah Zlaoui Mausoleum : Sidi Salah Zlaoui Mausoleum is mausoleum built in the 18th century by Salah Ibn Mohamed Zlaoui who was a very famous Sufist in Béja, the mausoleum was transformed by Jilani Zlaoui, one of Sidi Salah great-grandsons, into a mosque.  
Hammam Bousandel : Hammam Bousandel, is a public bath built in the 10th century, the bath is still operative till today.
Sabil Saheb Ettabaâ : Sabil Saheb Ettabaâ is a fountain built by Grand Vizier Youssef Saheb Ettabaa in 1800.

Notable people 
 Amor Chouikha - A scholar in religion and a teacher in Zaytouna. Thé first in front of the owners of Muted Pasha Mosque, the author of many books and works and judge, died in 1972 in Beja. 
 Mancient Christian basilicaohamed Arbi Zarrouk Khaznadar – 4th Grand Vizir of Tunisia from 1815 to 1822 (born in Le Bardo but his family is from Béja)
 Ismaïl Fathali – Tunisian Army Chief of Staff
 Wassila Ben Ammar – 2sd Tunisian First Lady from 1962 to 1986
 Ammar Farhat – Famous Tunisian painter 
 Slaheddine Ben Mbarek – Former Tunisian minister of National Economy, Commerce, Industry and Agriculture 
 Guy Bono – Former French MEP from The Socialist Party
 Neji Jouini – Former football referee
 Mohamed Ali Yousfi – Writer and translator
 Maurice Audin – Mathematician, member of the Algerian Communist Party and an activist in the anticolonialist cause
 Rafiq Belhaj Kacem – Former minister of the Interior
 Afouène Gharbi – Footballer
 Sofiane Labidi – Sprinter
 Moïne Chaâbani – Footballer
 Mohamed Sayari – Famous Tunisian actor and theatre director
 Chaker Zouagi – Footballer

Gallery

Sister cities
   Beja, Portugal (1993)
   Gibellina, Italy (2012)

External links

 Site officiel de la municipalité de Béja 
 250 cartes postales anciennes de Béja (1900–1950)

References

Notes

 
Communes of Tunisia
Populated places in Béja Governorate
Cities in Tunisia
Catholic titular sees in Africa
Historic Jewish communities in North Africa
Phoenician colonies in Tunisia